Pragyan is an ISO 9001:2015 and 20121:2012 certified annual international techno-management organisation of the National Institute of Technology, Tiruchirappalli, India. Since its inception in 2005, it has been held every year over a period of three and a half days during the months of January, February or March. Every year, Pragyan sees participants from over 100 colleges from across India. Pragyan 2017 had a total footfall of around 6,000 people over three days, and an overall participation of around 10,000 students. Pragyan is the first student-run organization in the world and the third organization overall next only to the London Olympics and Manchester United to achieve an ISO 20121:2012 Certification for Sustainable Event Management.

2005
The first Pragyan was held from 29 to 31 January 2005. The idea for a technical festival originated with the institution's students, who also bore responsibility for planning and organization; organization was supported both by the institution's director, P. Subramanian and by alumni, and guided by an advisory committee drawn from the institution's faculty.

2006
Pragyan 2006 was held from 28 to 31 January 2006. It had increased participation from colleges across India, and international participation for the first time in the programming event ByteCode. Prominent guest lecturers included Yash Pal, Stephen Wolfram, and Christopher Charles Benninger. The chief sponsor for this year was Tata Consultancy Services. Other major sponsors included Videocon, Airtel and Hewlett Packard. The participation was close to 1,000 students from more than 70 colleges.

2007
Pragyan 2007 was held from 1 to 4 February 2007, and included a large number of events encompassing both engineering and managerial disciplines. The guest lecture series, meant to give students an opportunity to listen to, interact with and be inspired by top practitioners from various disciplines included lectures by Douglas Osheroff, Rudolph Marcus, the aeronautical and mechanical engineer Guruswami Ravichandran, the author Gurcharan Das and a video-conference with Jimmy Wales, the co-founder of Wikipedia.

Pragyan 2007 featured an exhibition of re-modeled cars including a behind-the-scenes look organized by Dilip Chhabria of Dilip Chhabria Design Private Limited. In addition, there were a number of workshops including one on automobile design by Amarendra Kr. Das and another on digital signal processing - Pattern Recognition and Digital Watermarking. Pragyan 2007 also included a one-day management simulation game called "MyFirm". This event was hosted by Dr. Vinod Dumblekar, founder of MANTIS.

2008
Pragyan 2008 was held from 28 February to 2 March 2008. It included lectures by several eminent scientists including Philippe Lebrun from CERN, Ronald Mallett, Noam Chomsky, Subramanian Swamy, Trilochan Sastry, K.R. Sridhar and Philip Zimmermann. It also featured several new workshops on ham radio operation, Linux, bio-inspired robotics, astronomy and management.

2009
The fifth edition of Pragyan was held from 12 to 15 February 2009 in the NIT Trichy campus. The theme was 'Presenting the Future'. It included events, guest lectures, workshops and infotainment shows, some of which were conducted for the first time. Lectures were delivered by several notable guests including Peter Norvig from Google Research, astronaut Loren Acton, John C. Mather from NASA's Goddard Space Flight Center, Manish Tripathi from Dabbawallas and Kalyan Banerjee from Mindtree.

The most notable events include ByteCode — an online programming contest, Ventura — A business plan contest, Dalal Street — an online stock market simulation event, Avishkar — a design event and Ansyeshanam — a paper presentation contest.

There were a variety of workshops relating to JavaFX, animation, light painting and forensics.

The main sponsors were Petroleum Corporation Research Association, Mindtree, Department of Science and Technology (India), Sun Microsystems and TREC-STEP.

It also featured Crossfire, a panel discussion with noted panelists Prof. Anil Gupta from IIM-A, Dr P V Indiresan, Dr Sujatha Ramdorai and Dr Prabhakar Marur with Rashmi Bansal as the moderator. The theme for the panel discussion was 'India as a global knowledge superpower'.

Other shows organised under Infotainment for the entertainment of guests and participants included a display of Hand Shadowgraphy, a laser show with the theme 'Evolution' and a 'Techno-Magic' show by the renowned Christopher James.

In all, 38 events were organised and conducted over the course of the festival.

2010
With the tagline, "Create.. Innovate.. Scintillate", the sixth edition was celebrated from 25 to 28 February 2010. 

The main events were arranged into eight major clusters, namely, Encipher, Innovation,  Brainwork, Chill Pill, Managing Technology, Robovigyan, Engineering Tomorrow and Adrenaline.

Crossfire, the panel discussion, was an integral part of the festival. With an eminent set of panellists comprising L S Ganesh, Subramaniam Vincent, Kishore Kumar, Dr Ramesh Jain, Sudhish Kamath and Jagan Jothivel, the event, moderated by Krish Ashok, had the panellists debating the topic ‘Why aren't we I.D.I.O.T.S (I do it on my own terms)?’ to arrive at a common consensus.

Guest lectures offered students an opportunity to interact with the world's leading technologists — from famous Indians like Dr Ramesh Jain, N S Ramaswamy, Dr P. M. Bhargava, Dr Sreenidihi Varadharajan and Raj Bala, to foreign nationals such as Are Holen.

Workshops were aimed at putting to practice what one has already learned. Four workshops were organised - Adobe Flex, Ethical Hacking, 3D Photography and Hexapod robotics.

Exhibitions of various technological creations were set up across the campus. The Defence Research and Development Organisation presented a preview of some of India's finest arsenal and Bharath Electronics Limited displayed an array of military navigation system hardware. Hindustan Aeronautics Limited exhibited scale models and presentations on indigenous aircraft used by the Indian Armed Forces and their working.

The Infotainment shows included Sand Art by Amar Sen and a showcase of 3D visual effects, animation and other special effects by Zee Institute of Creative Arts. The final day had an air show and aircraft exhibition by the Rotor Sports and Hobby Club of Chennai.

In total, 43 events were conducted over the four-day period of the festival. The valedictory address was given by P S Rangaranjan from Tata Consultancy Services.

2011
The seventh edition of Pragyan was held from 17 to 20 February 2011. The tagline for the event was changed to "Let's celebrate technology" in this edition which included over 40 events, encompassing engineering, science and management.

Guest lectures by eminent personalities included David Hanson, Sugata Mitra, Narayanan Krishnan, T V Padma, Stefan Engeseth of Detective Marketing and Ajeet N Mathur, Professor, IIM Ahmedabad.

Workshops on Gesture Controlled Robotics: Haptics, Computer Animation, Cloud Computing, Mobile Applications, Management Workshop, and Aeromodeling were organized.

A panel discussion was organised called Crossfire, featuring speakers Krish Ashok, Dr L S Ganesh, Subramanian Vincent, Dr Ramesh Jain, Kishore Kumar and Jagan Jothivel, on the topic "From joint families to live-in relationship, from pen pals to Facebook, from outdoor games to video games – this generation has surely changed a lot. But are these changes for the good? What are the priorities of youth at present? Where are we headed? And where do we go from there?".

An electronic musical instrument called Reactable was displayed prominently. Other events organised included GREENgineer, SAVE AS YOU BUILD, GreeNITT and an IGBC Session (on environmental engineering).

Over a hundred students from across India and some from outside India participated in Pragyan 2011 in the online events.

2012
Pragyan in 2012 kept the previous year's tagline, "Let's Celebrate Technology". Held from 23 to 26 February 2012, the festival expanded to include more than 50 events, distributed into the categories of Brain Work, Innovation, Chill Pill, Robovigyan, Greengineering, OpeNIT, Management, Engineering Tomorrow and Encipher.

Initiatives of this Pragyan included the Chennai Open Quiz, which served as the curtain raising event, Lakshya, a symposium with talks given by civil servants and members of the armed forces. Pengufest, an open coding members' consortium, and Sangam, an inter-departmental technical contest were also new additions to this edition.

Guest lectures were an integral part of the festival, with prominent speakers like Gayle Lackmann McDowell, Gert Lanckriet, J N Reddy, Michael E Brown, Jeff Lieberman, Swaminathan Gurumurthy, Dr Vijay Chandru, Dr Sivathanu Pillai and Narendra Nayak presenting guest lectures across three days.

Workshops on Bipedal Robotics, IC Engines, Light Painting, Intro to Stocks, Pengufest and Cyber forensics were conducted.

Exhibitions at Pragyan 2012 had the motto "Seeing is Believing". Exhibitions like Advanced Robotic Systems, Gripper Arm, Augmented Reality, Laser Tag and Catapult were crowd pullers in this edition.

Crossfire, a panel discussion among various eminent personalities such as Amoghavarsha, A N Chandramouli, J N Reddy, Arunabh Kumar, J Balamurugan, Sarath Babu and Professor Vinod was held, with the topic being ‘It's not about the Degree, it's about the Passion’.

Additionally, under the Infotainment section, the festival had three major attractions. Pragyan began with the Sky Lanterns show. Sky Lanterns are made of oiled rice paper on a bamboo frame that contains a waxy fuel cell and are launched into the sky in large numbers to form a beautiful spectacle. Next, a laser show was organized by Infysec. The closing ceremony of Pragyan ended with a special show by Stigma, an internationally acclaimed team involved in various performance acts including LED shows and fire dancing.

The International Organization for Standardization (ISO) granted Pragyan the ISO 9001:2008 certification in February 2012.

2013
Pragyan 2013 was held from 1 to 4 March 2013. The festival included more than 50 events which were divided into different clusters like Brainwork, Chill Pill, Core Engineering, Code It, Innovation, Manigma and Robovigyan.

The Pragyan Outreach events included ‘The Pragyan Open Quiz 2013’, which served as the curtain raiser event, ‘Pragyan Campus Connect’, an informal interactive session between the freshers and the final years on what lay in wait in the forthcoming years in college and how best to make use of this learning curve, ‘Srishti’, a mobile making workshop held at the Institute of Yoga and Consciousness, Yoga Village, Visakhapatnam, ‘Disha’, the career counselling event for school and college students, ‘A Guide To Trichy’, a booklet detailing the must see places in Trichy, Wishberry, a Pragyan Social Responsibility initiative was brought out to help improve the infrastructure in a rural government school and ‘Pragyan Smart Cards’, a state-of-the-art replacement for the coupon distribution system.

The guest lectures featured prominent personalities like Anil Kakodkar, Tessy Thomas, Atul Gurtu, Rohan Dixit, David Christian and Richard Noble.

Workshops on Android Application Development, Automotive Systems and Advancements, Sixth Sense Robotics, Six Sigma, Tall Structure Design, Viral Media and Underwater Robotics were conducted.

The exhibitions were an absolute crowd puller with exhibits from DRDO, the spine of Indian Defense to Ark Technological Solutions, CVRDE, HAWT and Ark Technological Solutions.

Crossfire was titled "Failing Educational Institutions?" and featured eminent personalities like Chris Philips (Professor, Imperial College London), Dr Sultan Ahmed Ismail (Professor, New College Chennai), Bushra Shariff (artist manager and singer), Professor Eugene D’Vas (St. Joseph's College, Trichy) and Prashanth Raj (Managing partner and director, Viral Fever Media). The panel discussion was moderated by Professor Vinod of the Humanities Department, NIT(Trichy).

Infotainment included Informals Fire Show, 3D Projection Mapping, Comedy Nightout by TVF, Pragyan's Got Talent Shows, Thalavattam Band and a Robo Dance performance by Robo Ganesh.

2015
The eleventh edition of NIT Trichy's techno-managerial fest, Pragyan, was held from 26 February 2015 to 1 March 2015. With 50 odd events being organised under eight clusters namely Code-It, Manigma, Chill Pill, Amalgam, Core Engineering, RoboVigyan, Out of the Box and Landscape, the edition saw the participation of students from over 100 colleges.

SquareOne 2014, outreach programme of Pragyan 2015, was held in Sathyabama University, Chennai on 1 and 2 November. With the conduction of four different events including a guest lecture, Circuitrix, the regional prelims of Pragyan Open Quiz, and a hovercraft workshop, the programme was a huge success.

This edition of Pragyan also witnessed the inception of the Pragyan Hackathon as part of its outreach events which saw massive participation from students across the country.

With 13 guests coming down to deliver lectures including Marshall Strabala, Dr. Jitendra Joshi, Paul Halpern, Suneet Tuli, Robin Chase, T. S. Krishnamurthy, Ananth Krishnan, Jill Tarter, Raju Venkatraman, Guhesh Ramanathan, Scott R Peppet, Rakshit Tandon and Rakesh Godwani, the guest lectures of the edition were awe-inspiring.

Exhibits included NASA Moon Rock, Brain controlled Helicopter, NAO Humanoid Robots and Masha Nazeem's social exhibits.

Sangam saw the students of NIT Trichy develop, innovate and exhibit projects such as Drone assisted Navigation, Geodesic Dome project, Fan Wing Aircraft and Perovskite Solar Cell.

As part of its social responsibility, Pragyan organised two events - Pathways and Dhisai. Aiming to enlighten students about the Joint Entrance Examination (JEE), this social responsibility event covered 2400 schools from various schools in Tamil Nadu. Pathways, held in Coimbatore Institute of Technology, encompassed the fundamentals and details of higher studies in India and abroad, and saw the congregation of students, professors and different embassies.

Infotainment at Pragyan 2015 included Light and Fire Shows by Pyroterra, Semi-finalists of Britain's Got Talent, Atul Khatri and Angad Singh Rayal from East India Comedy, and Radium Painting by Vivek Patil.

2016
From 25 to 26 February NIT Trichy held its annual techno-managerial fest Pragyan with 'Fractals' as its theme. With INR 1.4 million at stake the fest featured 47 events under 8 clusters namely CodeIT, Manigma, Chill Pill, Amalgam, Core Engineering, Landscape, Out of Box and Robo Vigyan.

SquareOne, Pragyan's annual outreach program, was held at Kochi which featured a Quadcopter workshop and a robot building contest. Also a one-day edition of SquareOne was held at IIT Madras which consisted of events such as Grab to Smash, Hunt the Code and The Ultimate Manager.

The social responsibility wing of Pragyan conducted Catalyst, a one-day workshop on MS Office for the students of Boiler Plant Girls Higher Secondary School in BHEL township. As a year-round project, PSR in association with LEAP (the environment club of the college) and the Entrepreneurship cell launched PET Project, an initiative to reduce the wastage of paper in campus. This was launched after considering the enormous wastage of paper that occurs in the campus. A collection box was placed in the Octagon (the computer centre) to collect the roll number sheets that are generated for each student with a print command. The sheets were then used for activities such as making notebooks and helping Self Help Groups by teaching them to make paper products. Talks on Career Counselling and Cybercrime were conducted by professionals.

Pragyan'16 had renowned speakers such as Peter G. Schultz, Ralph Leighton, Varun Agarwal, Archana Sharma, Sudhir Kumar Mishra and Gianni Di Carro.

14 workshops were conducted by various professionals during Pragyan. Various skills that were covered include IBM cloud computing, Astro-Photography, IC engines, Haptic Robotic arm and more.

The exhibits of Prayan'16 were well received and succeeded in pulling huge volumes of crowd. Metalemate Robotics, automated chess board, smart vehicles bu IBOTS and INVENTROM BOLT were a few that made their mark during Pragyan'16.

Pragyan'16 was phenomenal in offering Infotainment shows as many talented and enchanting performances were presented as part of Infotainment. A few honorable mentions include J C Sum, Sorabh Pant, Girasomnis and Illuminati.

2017

Pragyan'17 was conducted from 2 to 5 March with 'Light' as the theme. This year two new clusters Grey Cells and Impact were added along with the existing 8 other clusters. Pragyan'17 saw participation form various institutions across India with students actively engaged in the 50 events offered.

For the first time Square one the annual outreach program of Pragyan was simultaneously conducted in two cities. On 4 and 5 February, SRM Institute of Science and Technology and CUSAT hosted the plethora of events and workshops conducted by Pragyan as a part of SquareOne.

As NIT Trichy's contribution to Rashtriya Aavishkar Abhiyan, PSR invited school children in the neighbourhood to witness and take part in Pragyan 2017. Under the Catalyst initiative, science experiments were demonstrated to students of two neighbouring schools. Pragyan Pizza Project was a pet project of PSR; customers at Domino's Pizza, Trichy were gifted saplings which could be planted in their surroundings. A fire safety awareness campaign was conducted with help from personnel from Tamil Nadu Fire Rescue Services. A Campus Initiative Week was celebrated in which volunteers of the team took many steps to improve life in the campus. An awareness campaign against the use of high-beam headlights was also conducted.

Richard A. Muller, Kishore Jayaraman, Henry Throop, David J. Peterson, Ada Yonath, A. Sivathanu Pillai, Rajshekhar Murthy and Nandini Harinath delivered lectures to the ever enthusiastic crowd of Pragyan as a part of the Guest lecture series.

14 workshops were conducted and saw immense participation from students across the nation. Data Analytics, PTC Creo, Network designing and Nikon photography are few that were covered.

The exhibits of Pragyan'17 include Smart Drone, Vantablack (Vertically Aligned Nanotube Arrays), INDRO Humanoid Robot, Spero E-Bike, Antique Cameras - Dr. Arun's Photography and Vintage Camera Museum.

The infotainment at Pragyan'17 were nothing less of spectacular as it featured some of the greatest talents out there. Laser Show by Laser Show India, Illusionist Chris Cheong, UV and Fire Shows by the Slovakian troupe Anta Agni and Comedy Night by Biswa Kalyan Rath were conducted as a part of Infotainment at Pragyan'17.

2018

Pragyan, in its 14th iteration themed "The Next Dimension" was held from 1 through 4 March. With the "Landscape" cluster removed, the fest featured 39 events split across 9 clusters.

Pragyan's outreach program SquareOne was held in September 2017 in Madurai at the Thiagarajar College of Engineering and in October 2017 in Coimbatore at the Sri Krishna College of Engineering & Technology. The outreach events consisted of Circutrix, The Ultimate Manager, and Marketing Hub among many others.

The Pragyan Social Responsibility Team held a disaster management program Raksha, in which safety procedures, drills and training was given to the school students. To celebrate the literacy day, Karka Kasadara, a program for collection of study material was conducted. PSR members collected books and other material from nearby schools and localities. In the final stage, the collection was donated to orphanages along with stationery kits. A water conservation awareness drive, Foresight, was conducted on 11 February 2018 at the LA Cinemas.

Ajay Bhatt, Bhargavi Nuvvula, Dr. Casey Handmer, Dr. Robert Metcalfe, Dr. A.S. Ramasastri, Dr. Kevin Grazier, Mrs. Meher Pudunjee, Shivshankar Menon and Ramamoorthi Ramesh presented great lectures with an amazing crowd reach and appeal.

Pragyan ‘18 offered 20 different workshops which were all very well received. Cyber Security, Armoured Fighting Vehicle, High Performance Computing, Deep Learning, IoT, Data Analytics were some workshops that stood out.

The exhibits of Pragyan‘18 were some of the biggest crowd pullers. This edition's presentation included Hyperloop, Bionic Arm, UGears, InMoov,, ISRO Rocket Propulsion Models and many others.

Taking the Infotainment Stage this year were some of the greatest talents in the world. The performers included Azeem Banatwala, Parchai Group, Shao the manipulator, Suhani Shah, Shawn Chua and Shivraj Morzaria who all left the crowd mesmerized and stupefied.

2019

Pragyan ’19 was held from 14 March to 17 March, the theme of the annual techno-managerial fest being ‘Spectrum’. The events clusters received a major do-over with the 7 clusters namely: Roborex, Bytehoc, Manigma, Concreate, Phronesis, Trivia and Conception. The fest featured 30 revamped events spread across the named 7 clusters.

Pragyan saw the establishment of its first ever Model United Nations with multiple committees and agendas, under the name Pragyan International MUN (PIMUN).

SquareOne, the annual outreach program of Pragyan was held on 13 and 14 October 2019 in the SCAD College of Engineering and Technology. Another edition of SquareOne was conducted on 28 October 2018 in the Government College of Engineering, Salem. The program consisted of two unique workshops and 3 events, like ‘The Ultimate Manager’ and ‘Memory Challenge’.

As a gesture of effort towards social causes, the social responsibility team at Pragyan conducted ‘Aval’, a venture to enhance the lives of blind women at rehabilitation centres. A self-defense workshop ‘Vallinam’ was held with awareness sessions on mental and physical behaviours in situations of crunch. An initiative ‘Green the Red’, an awareness programme on sustainable menstruation, was held at the Government High School, Thirunedungulam.

As a part of the guest lecture series at Pragyan, renowned speakers Dr. Spyridon Michalakis, Ms. Amrita Shah, Dr. Crystal Dilworth, Dr. P.G. Diwakar, Dr. Montek Singh Ahluwalia, Dr. Ramesh Venkatesan, Dr. Frederick J. Raab and Dr. Alwyn D. Singh delivered inspiring speeches and lectures.

This edition of Pragyan consisted of 14 workshops on a wide variety of fields covering Deep Learning, AR, Blockchains, Software and others. These workshops gathered great interest and participation in the fest.

Infotainment included some spectacular performances by bubbleologist Graham Maxwell, digital dancer Ramod Malaka, Yanika Beliza, puppeteer Anne Klinge, laser harpist Heimdall and DJ Sonic Snares.

2020

The ‘Pixel’ themed 16th iteration of Pragyan was to be held from 12 to 15 March. The edition was cancelled due to the COVID-19 pandemic.

The Social Responsibility team at Pragyan, PSR, conducted She Talks, a tech summit dedicated to women, at St Peter's Institute of Higher Education and Research. Under the Catalyst initiative, basic education in science, math and English were imparted to schools in nearby rural areas. As a part of the Young Techie program, high school students were given the opportunity to obtain mentorship for their projects from the technical clubs of NIT-Trichy. A new initiative ‘Shelves of Joy’, was introduced to circulate books and other supplies to those in need. A signing event ‘One Less Light’ was conducted to show the impact of switching off electrical devices and appliances.

Pragyan's annual outreach program, SquareOne, was conducted in two cities. It was held on 10 November 2019 at the University CoE, Villupuram and on 25 January 2020 at the Institute of Road and Transport Technology, Erode. IC engine and Embedded Systems Workshops were conducted along with events like Memory Challenge and The Ultimate Manager.

2021 
The 17th edition of Pragyan, NIT Trichy's annual techno-managerial festival, was successfully conducted from 25 March 2021 to 12 April 2021, with The Metaverse as the theme.

Despite all the struggles of conducting a fest amidst a pandemic, Pragyan '21 strived to adapt to the situation and managed to pull off an impressive feat. Students across the country participated enthusiastically in the various events and workshops offered, in spite of the virtual nature of the festival.

Pragyan '21 officially commenced with the inauguration ceremony on 28 March 2021, with Dr. Vandana Verma, Chief Engineer of Robotics Operations at NASA, as the Chief Guest and Mr. Deepankar Bhattacharyya, Autodesk Education Head, India as the Guest of Honour.

The Pragyan Guest Lecture series, Illumináre, saw experts from various fields share their insights. The interactive atmosphere facilitated students to connect with the guests directly. The series had five instalments, delivered by Dr. Vandana Verma, Prof. Rishikesha T Krishnan, Dr. Ken Yeang, Mr. Philip Rosedale, and Mr. Yogesh Gupta.

Pragyan '21 conducted various fascinating workshops on the fields of Data Analytics, 3D printing, automation, AI, Industrial IoT, Robot Simulation, etc. To help the students let their hair down and have an enjoyable learning experience, Pragyan '21 conducted several events like Manigma, Conception, Concreate, Pandora's Box, Bytehoc, Roborex, Phronesis, and Ewitts, where students participated enthusiastically.

Pragyan Infotainment featured four renowned artists who put on electrifying shows - TheRealSullyG, LEDRebel, Soumyajit Pyne, and Anne Klinge. Additionally, exhibits such as Prosthesis - the largest tetrapod exoskeleton, and an interview with famed German sculptor Julian Voss-Andreae received appreciation from all.

For the gaming enthusiasts and the students who wanted to have some fun, Pragyan '21 provided the perfect opportunity by conducting the Escape Room event and the eSports competition.  

Pragyan presented Sangam, the annual intra-college hackathon, and Ingenium, an inter-college technical exhibition and competition for tech enthusiasts. This provided students with two excellent platforms to compete with their peers and show off their skills. Young Techie 2.0 called upon school children to showcase their talents while being mentored by the technical clubs of NIT Trichy. Numerous students rose to the challenge and participated with great zeal and zest.

References

External links
https://www.pragyan.org/21/home/

National Institutes of Technology
Recurring events established in 2005
Technical festivals in India
Culture of Tiruchirappalli